Rav River is a river in western India in Gujarat whose origin is Near Lilpar village. Its drainage basin has a maximum length of 25 km. The total catchment area of the basin is 126 km2.

References

Rivers of Gujarat
Rivers of India